Robert Macbeth (1862–1931) was an English footballer. He started his career in Scotland signing for  St.Bernard's in 1882, an Edinburgh club, and played there for one season. 

Macbeth moved to England in 1883 and signed for Accrington playing friendlies and FA Cup ties.

In the final season before the Football League started Macbeth signed for Grimsby Town. He left sometime in 1888. (Date not recorded)

Macbeth played in The Football League for Accrington, Northwich Victoria and Rotherham Town. Robert Macbeth made his debut and played his only game of the inaugural Football League season of 1888–1889 on 19 January 1889. He played on the left wing and played at Thorneyholme Road, Accrington. Accrington lost 0–2 to Blackburn Rovers.

Statistics
Source:

References

English footballers
Association football forwards
Accrington F.C. players
Northwich Victoria F.C. players
Rotherham Town F.C. (1878) players
Grimsby Town F.C. players
Burton Swifts F.C. players
English Football League players
Place of birth missing
Place of death missing
1862 births
1931 deaths